Yhtyneet Paperitehtaat Oy was a Finnish forest industry company which was created in 1920 and the paper company formed UPM-Kymmene PLC together with Kymmene in 1996.

History
United Paper Mills Ltd. was created in summer 1920 when Ab Simpele Jämsänkoski Oy and Myllykoski Träsliperi Ab merged. Later Ab Walkiakoski Oy that is located in Valkeakoski was merged with the company. In the management of all the companies the large owner was general Rudolf Walden. General Walden's objective was to form as big as possible and competitive unit of Finland's scattered forest industry. The same objective was striven for by founding Finland's Paperitehdass association (1918–1996) Finnpap and cardboard association Finnboard.

Myllykoski Oy separated from United Paper Mills Ltd. Oy 1952. In the 1950s the paper mill of Kaipola was built. The ones which had united extended strongly and drifted into financing difficulties at the end of the 1960s. In 1970 and the 1980s the company aimed abroad and invests on the EEC market and Stracelin to the factories, Shotton. In 1989 UPM merged Kajaani Oy with himself.

The company met the recession of the 1990s in Finland in good profit performance. With the management of Kansallis-Osake-Pankki the company was merged with Rauma-Repola. Repola Oy which became the biggest industrial enterprise in Finland was formed. UPM formed the wood industry of the conglomerate when Rauma Oy formed the metal industry. Finnpap also was merged as part of a new company.

Management of Yhtyneet Paperitehtaat 1920-1995
 General Rudolf Walden, founder, head owner and chairman of the government 1920–1944
 mining counsellor Juuso Walden managing director 1940–1969
 dipl INS. Niilo Hakkarainen, managing director 1970–1991
 dipl INS. Olli Parola, managing director 1990–1995

Managers of UPM-Kymmene
 Master of Science in Economics and Business Administration, mining counsellor Juha Niemelä 1995–2004
 dipl INS. Jussi Pesonen 2004

References

Pulp and paper companies of Finland